The GM Diesel/Detroit Diesel model 6051 Quad power pack consists of four inline 2-stroke diesel 6-71 engines mounted to one gearbox, usually with one shaft coming out of the power unit. The power units were fitted on landing craft and ships during World War II, ships including LCI(L), Prab (741) and Nahka (751) were fitted with two of these power units to drive two propellers, Mataphon (761) was fitted with three. There is a later model of this power pack which has a standard solid shaft for fixed pitch props while the 6051 model is specially designed with a hollow main shaft and a sliding inner shaft with a hub on the end that changes the pitch on the propeller.

Specifications
 number of engines - 4
 model of engines - 671LA28H, 67LC28H, 671RC28H, 671RA28H  series 71 engines
 Number of cylinders per engine- 6
 Bore      - 4¼ "
 stroke    - 5"
 cubic inch per cylinder 71ci
 cubic inch per engine 426ci, 7.0L
 Engine RPM- 500 to 2100
 gearbox reduction ratio- 3.23-1
 rated HP - 900 total
 lube oil Cap. per engine - dry, 19 qts
 lube oil Cap. per engine -refill, 17qts
 cooling wat Cap. - 142qts total
 starter motor  - 24v, solenoid operated
 clutch  - 16" single plate, dry disc
 gearbox oil cap.  - 6½ gal
 propeller - controllable pitch
 prop size - 46"
 control - electrical control switch at log desk

See also
 Detroit Diesel Series 71
 Gray Marine 6-71 Diesel Engine
 LCI(L)
 Two-stroke diesel engine

References

General Motors Diesel engine div., Models 6051 quad and 2003 2 cylinder series 71 unit. Operators' Handbook Jan. 1943 rev. Apr. 24, 1944
Operators' Hand Book Supplementing the Operating and Maintenance Manual, Revised Edition Restricted, Models 6051 Quad 6-Cylinder and 2003 2-Cylinder, Series 71 Diesel Units 1944 General Motors Diesel Engine Div.

6051